Disabled Iranian veterans, called janbaz (literally "those who were willing to lose their lives") in Iran, mostly constitute the disabled veterans of the Iran–Iraq war. According to Mohammad Esfandiari, director of communications and public relations of Iran's Martyrs and Disabled Veterans' Organization, there are 548,499 disabled veterans of the Iran–Iraq War living in Iran as of June 2014, a number which includes the victims of Iraq's chemical weapon attacks on Iran, called "chemical janbaz". Among the disabled veterans are more than 10,000 veterans with foot and ankle injuries related to war.

Chemical warfare veterans
After Iraqi chemical attacks against Iranian soldiers and civilians, from 1983 to 1988, the number of people sustained injuries, including respiratory (42%), ocular (39%) and skin complications (25%) was more than 3,400 – a number which increased to at least 45,000 twenty years later, "due to the occurrence of late respiratory complications of mustard gas exposure." "The latency period can be as much as 40 years" and "So almost every day there are new cases — 30 years after the war," said Shahriar Khateri, the co-founder of the Society for Chemical Weapons Victims Support. According to Farhad Hashemnezhad in 2002, at least 20 percent of the patients were "civilians who didn't think they were close enough to be exposed." This large number of chemically affected veterans has made Iran the world's largest laboratory for the study of the effects of chemical weapons. According to a declassified CIA report, as a result of Iraq's repeated use of nerve agents and toxic gases in the 1980s, Iran suffered more than 50,000 casualties mostly by mustard gas used in dusty, liquid and vapor forms packed into bombs and artillery shells which were then fired at the front lines and beyond, at targets such as hospitals. The number of registered chemically affected veterans was 70,000 by 2014, according to Shahriar Khateri, Iran's leading expert on chemical weapons victims. "awareness could have saved lives," Khateri said. Doctors estimate that the final toll of Iraq's chemical weapons could be as high as 90,000, equal to the total deaths from all toxic gases in World War I.

During the Iran–Iraq War, mustard gas was used by Iraq against Iran, and it was the "first time ever that nerve agents such as sarin and tabun were employed." Experiencing the outcomes of the chemical weapons, chemical warfare veterans believe that the younger generations should be instructed that "war is not a computer game." "We want to show how painful the consequences are. We don't want revenge. We just want to show what happens so it won't happen again," said Saadi, injured by Iraqi mustard gas.

Psychiatric veterans
The number of mentally disabled veterans including those who have PTSD is increasing some of them increasingly showing signs of mental issues and the mental health conditions have worsened with age in others.

Services
Mobility and access to medical care are one of the major challenges for many disabled Iranian veterans. In Tehran alone there are very few wheelchair-accessible ramps, elevators and parking spots and the problem is more serious in smaller cities. This is while by 2018 over 5,000 disabled Iranian veterans, mostly living in the capital, are reliant on wheelchairs for mobility. According to the Tehran Metro Group many more elevators are needed in Tehran's subway system. To provide better services for disabled veterans, the Iranian government has announced that around $5 million has been dedicated to constructing ramps and wheelchair-accessible paths throughout Tehran. No similar official plans are dedicated for other cities in Iran.

In Tehran, chemical weapons victims are often referred to the Sasan Hospital.

The Tehran Peace Museum plans to focus on the enduring human consequences of Iran–Iraq War and serves as a centre for surviving victims of the war, especially chemical warfare veterans attacked by Saddam Hussein's forces.

In addition to numerous laws and regulations the Iranian government has passed to address disability related issues, the Disability Protect Act, including 16 articles
providing legal protections for disabled persons in areas such as public building access, education, housing and finance, has been Iran's
most progressive and comprehensive legislation concerning disabled persons which was passed in 2003.

The Janbazan Foundation is created by Iran government for the assistance of Iranian disabled veterans and for giving them special treatment. They also receive services such as financial loan from Foundation of Martyrs and Veterans Affairs.

In popular culture
Veterans are presented with awards and are thanked for their service on formalities such as ceremonies which are plentiful and widely covered in the Iranian media, particularly on two annual national occasions, namely Disabled Veterans' Day in May and Sacred Defence Week (Sept. 20–27), which commemorates the commencement of the Iran–Iraq War.

According to the supreme leader of Iran, Ali Khamenei, "disabled war veterans are images of the war crimes of big powers who encouraged former Iraqi dictator Saddam Hussein to invade Iran."

See also
 Wounded in action
 Martyr
 Iraqi chemical attacks against Iran
 Az Karkheh ta Rhein, Iranian movie
 Ra'ad Rehabilitation Goodwill Complex

References

Iran–Iraq War
Disability in Iran
Chemical weapons
Iran